Prakash Gunvantrao Bharsakale is a member of the 14th Maharashtra Legislative Assembly. He represents the Akot Assembly Constituency of Akola district. He belongs to the Bharatiya Janata Party.

Political career
Prakash Bharsakale was Shivsena worker. He got opportunity in 1990 from Daryapur constituency and he won the election as Shivsena candidate.
Bharsakale resigned from Shivsena in 2005 because Narayan Rane was expelled from the Shivsena.
He joined the Indian National Congress along with Narayan Rane and won the by-election held in 2005 as congress candidate from Daryapur constituency.
In 2009 he left the Congress and contested Akot (Vidhan Sabha constituency) as an Independent candidate but lost the election.
Prakash Bharsakale joined BJP in 2012.
In 2014 he got an opportunity from Akot (Vidhan Sabha constituency) as BJP candidate and won the election with large margin of votes against Congress candidate.

Daryapur Constituency
He served as MLA from 1990 to 2009 from Daryapur-Anjangaon Vidhansabha.
Later he contested from Akot Vidhansabha because his constituency is reserved for Schedule Caste.

Amravati Loksabha 1991
Prakash Bharsakale contested Amravati Loksabha election in 1991 against strong Congress women leader and former President of India Pratibha Patil but lost the election.
He secured 121784 votes against Pratibha Patil.

Daryapur constituency by-election
In 2005 Bharsakale joined Congress with Narayan Rane and faced by-election.
Bharsakale won the by-election as Congress candidate against Balasaheb Hingnikar a Shivsena candidate.

References

1964 births
Living people
Bharatiya Janata Party politicians from Maharashtra
Maharashtra MLAs 2014–2019
Maharashtra MLAs 2019–2024
Marathi politicians
People from Akola district
Shiv Sena politicians